On 21 December 1983, Spain played Malta in the last qualifying match for UEFA Euro 1984. The game is often described as one of the most important in Spain's national football team's history.

Background
Four days before the game, the Netherlands defeated Malta 5–0 and finished their qualification schedule with 13 points and a goal difference of +16. If Spain won their final qualifier and thus also finished on 13 points, then goal difference would decide which team qualified.

With a goal difference of +5, Spain would need to defeat Malta by a margin of 11 or more goals to qualify. The team had only managed to score 12 goals in their previous seven matches, and before the game the Maltese goalkeeper, John Bonello, said: "I wouldn't return to my country if they scored 11 goals."

After 17 December, and before Spain's match against Malta, the group 7 table stood as follows:

Match

Summary
Spain's only chance of qualifying for Euro 1984 was to defeat Malta by at least 11 goals.
In the second minute of the match, Spain were awarded a penalty kick after a foul on Francisco José Carrasco inside the box. However, Juan Antonio Señor subsequently missed the penalty in the fourth minute after the shot deflected back off the left post and was cleared by a Maltese defender for a corner. After Santillana opened the scoring for Spain in the 15th minute, Malta's Michael Degiorgio levelled the score 1–1 in the 24th minute.

When half-time came and the scoreline was 3–1 to Spain, few expected them to score enough goals to qualify. However, Juan Antonio Señor, who had missed the early penalty, scored Spain's 12th and last goal in the 88th minute; Rafael Gordillo nearly scored a 13th in the final minutes of the game but it was disallowed by the referee. That did not matter, however, as the Spaniards won by the 11-goal margin required for them to beat the Netherlands to qualification.

Details

Timeline

Aftermath

The match was broadcast by RTVE in Spain. Afterwards, in Malta, many claimed  that the Maltese were paid to not play their best and to let Spain win by a large margin, and it was rumoured that words had been exchanged between Maltese and Spanish officials and players at half-time. In March 2018, two Maltese players, Silvio Demanuele and Carmel Busuttil, claimed that Spain had been using doping as "they had foam in their mouths and could not stop drinking water". They also claim the Maltese players were drugged via lemon wedges during halftime. However, as of 2018, no evidence has come forth to support these allegations.

The Malta Football Association launched an inquiry into the result, and its chairman George Abela (later the President of Malta) brought about changes to the national team. Abela said that a lack of facilities meant that the team lacked serious professional preparation for a tournament such as the European Championships, and the closeness of away fixtures (Malta had played in the Netherlands only four days before their 12–1 loss in Seville) was a further hindrance and such scheduling would be avoided in future.

Final table
Spain and the Netherlands finished the qualification stage level on 13 points, level on goal difference, but Spain qualified on goals scored (24, compared to 22 for the Netherlands).

Records
The match produced the second-largest win in Spain's history (the largest was 13–0 against Bulgaria in 1933), and Malta's largest loss.
The four goals scored by Santillana put him as the top goalscorer in qualifying group 7.

See also
 UEFA Euro 1984 qualifying Group 7
 Spain national football team results

References

External links
 Integral video of the game 'ESP 12–1 MLT' rtve.es

UEFA European Championship matches
UEFA Euro 1984 qualifying
1983
1983
Malta
Spain
December 1983 sports events in Europe
Sports competitions in Seville
20th century in Seville
Malta–Spain relations